The Human Resources University (commonly referred to as HR University or HRU) was part of the United States Office of Personnel Management which serves as the national focal point for the development and delivery of human resources training to enhance the capabilities of the Federal workforce. HRU provided services to Federal human resources contractor personnel as well. Since inception HRU had more than 50,000 registered students from across the Federal government. In April 2014 HRU received some publicity for saving the Federal government over $100 million in cost savings in training costs.

HRU’s mission was to offer a learning environment to develop qualified human resources professionals across the United States Federal Government. HRU was the primary training organization for the Federal Human Resources Workforce, and provided formal and informal training for students both in the classroom and on the job. HRU provided formal classroom and online training and had a virtually continuous presence with the workforce through online continuous learning and knowledge sharing on HRU's Web site. HRU’s training opportunities worked to enhance workplace performance and promote mission effectiveness in order to provide a foundation for the future of the Federal Human Resources workforce.

HRU provided the following services:
 Leadership training
 Online knowledge-sharing resources
 Continuous learning training
 Strategic partnerships with universities

History

HRU was created as a result of critical necessity, identified in high-level studies by the Chief Human Capital Officers (CHCO) Council in 2009.  This governance organization wanted to provide a professional career path and consistency of training content and opportunities for the Federal Human Resources Workforce. In 2011 HRU was founded by the CHCO Council, OPM, and with the assistance of the Executive Human Resources Community Leadership across the Federal Government.  HRU was managed by a Provost who reports to the Director of the Office of Personnel Management. The founding Provost was Kathryn Medina and she served in this capacity from 2011 to 2012.  The last provost was Dr. Sydney Smith-Heimbrock.

Present day
As of Friday, September 14, 2018, HR University (HRU.gov) is no longer an active website. Users will still be able to access available resources via OPM.gov and Telework.gov.

Leadership

HRU has had two provosts lead it throughout HRU's history:

 Kathryn Medina (2011–2012)
 Dr. Sydney Smith-Heimbrock (2012–Present)

Background information

HRU is located at the United States Office of Personnel Management headquarters in Washington, DC.  HRU serves members of the Federal Human Resources Workforce who are located around the country and world. HRU is responsible for the training and career development of the more than 50,000 registered students, and has an extensive virtual presence online.

Resources

Eligibility
The applicant must have an affiliation with the United States Federal government in order to qualify to participate in training courses offered by HRU. Federal employees and contractor personnel supporting the government with Human Resource requirements are eligible to enroll and take courses.

Transcripts
HRU also provides transcripts at no cost to the student.

HRU Resource Center
Enrolled HRU students are granted access to the HRU Resource Center. The HRU Resource Center is the primary repository and distribution system of media on-demand productions presented by Federal Human Resources leaders, model practitioners, and HRU staff and faculty in multiple formats, designed to provide Federal Human Resource members with valuable training resources.

Course Catalog
The HRU Interactive Course Catalog provides up-to-date information regarding the university’s classroom and online learning assets, various developmental guides, and alternate means to meet training requirements through various programs or partnerships.

Individual Development Plan
The Individual development plan assists the student with helping them to map their career development in a strategic fashion. HRU will provide a customizable template that the student can then use to build upon their technical proficiencies.

Resources for Managers
HRU offers courses, training videos, tools, templates and other resources to assist managers, directors, supervisors, and executives.

Strategic Partnerships 
HRU has established strategic partnerships with American University, George Mason University, University of Maryland University College, and The Catholic University of America.

See also

 United States Federal Government
 Office of Personnel Management
 List of colleges and universities in Washington, D.C.

References

External links
 HRU official website
 OPM official website
 HRU on Facebook

Educational institutions established in 2011
Executive branch of the government of the United States
United States Office of Personnel Management
Universities and colleges in Washington, D.C.
2011 establishments in Washington, D.C.